Dolichoderus taschenbergi is a species of ant in the genus Dolichoderus. Described by Mayr in 1866, the species is endemic to Canada and the United States.

References

Dolichoderus
Hymenoptera of North America
Insects described in 1866